Shamsunnahar Smrity (born 24 October 1992), known by her stage name Pori Moni, is a Bangladeshi film actress. Her notable works includes Aro Bhalobashbo Tomay, Rokto, and Swapnajaal. She was listed in Forbes Asia’s "100 Digital Stars" magazine in December 2020.

Early life 
Shamsunnahar Smrity was born on 24 October 1992, in the Satkhira District. After losing her parents in childhood, she grew up in her maternal grandparents' house in Pirojpur, where she earned her secondary and higher secondary school certificates.

Career 
Moni's first film, Rana Plaza, based on the Rana Plaza disaster, was denied certification by the Bangladesh Film Censor Board, who stated that it was a national disaster that people may misunderstand. Her second film Bhalobasha Shimaheen was released on 13 February 2015. She co-starred with Shakib Khan in Aro Bhalobashbo Tomay and Dhumketu.

Personal life 
Moni married her cousin Ismail Hossain in 2010 and divorced him in 2012. She then married footballer Ferdous Kabir Sourav in April 2012. In 2019, Moni was engaged to RJ Tamim Hasan, but later they broke up. In March 2020, she married film director Kamruzzaman Roni but this marriage did not last. 

In October 2021, she married actor-model Sariful Razz. Razz-Porimoni became parents of a boy, Shaheem Muhammad Rajya, on 10 August 2022. On 31 December 2022, Moni confirmed her separation with Razz via social media later stating that she left his house with son Rajya a day prior.

Controversies 

On 8 June 2021, Moni accused Nasir Uddin Mahmood, a businessman and politician of the Jatiya Party, of sexual assault on her at the Boat Club in Ashulia, Uttara. She asked Prime Minister Sheikh Hasina for justice on Facebook. On June 14, Mahmood and businessman Tuhin Siddique Omi were arrested by the Bangladesh Police, but Mahmood was later released on bail. A week later, Moni was accused of vandalism at the Gulshan All Community Club. The club's president, K.M. Alamgir Iqbal, accused her of vandalizing the club on June 7 night at a press conference.

Detention 
On 4 August 2021, the Rapid Action Battalion (RAB) raided Moni's house in Banani. She was arrested on alleged charges of possessing lysergic acid diethylamide, crystal methamphetamine, and 30 bottles of foreign liquor from the house. On 5 August, Dhaka court magistrate Mamunur Rashid granted a 4-day remand against Moni, film producer Nazrul Islam Raj, and two of their associates in connection with separate narcotics cases filed under the Narcotics Control Act 1990.

On 31 August, Dhaka Metropolitan Sessions Judge KM Imrul Kayes granted Moni bail and she was released the next morning after 27 days of detention.

Filmography

Television 
 2nd Innings (2013–2014) - Directed by Idris Haider 
 Exclusive
 Extra Bachelor
 Nari
 Nobonita Tomar Jonno
 Oshomapto Valobasha
 Mon Bhalo Nai
 Kotha Dilam
 Epar Opar
 Keno Miche Nokkhotrera
 Aktukhani

Short films

Awards

References

Further reading

External links
 
 

1992 births
Living people
People from Khulna
Bangladeshi film actresses
Bangladeshi television actresses
CJFB Performance Award Winners
Place of birth missing (living people)
Satkhira Government College alumni